Sir George Bevan Bowen  (1858 – 3 July 1940) was a Welsh Conservative landowner and county officer in Pembrokeshire.

He was the son of James Bevan Bowen, a former Tory member of parliament, and was educated at Cheltenham College and  Magdalen College, Oxford.  He served with the Pembroke Yeomanry from 1880 to 1885.

He was Master of the Tivyside Hunt, 1893–97 and High Sheriff of Pembrokeshire in 1914.

He was appointed Knight Commander of the Most Excellent Order of the British Empire) in 1928.

In 1882 he married Florence, only daughter of Deputy Surgeon-General Frederick Corbyn.  They had a son, James Bevan Bowen (an RAF Officer) and five daughters.

A portrait of him is held by the National Portrait Gallery.

References

1858 births
1940 deaths
People educated at Cheltenham College
Alumni of Magdalen College, Oxford
Knights Commander of the Order of the British Empire
English justices of the peace
Deputy Lieutenants of Pembrokeshire
High Sheriffs of Pembrokeshire
Masters of foxhounds in Wales